Fulvimarina pelagi is a Gram-negative, strictly aerobic, non-motile bacteria from the genus of Fulvimarina which was isolated from sea water from the western Sargasso Sea.

References

External links
Type strain of Fulvimarina pelagi at BacDive -  the Bacterial Diversity Metadatabase

Hyphomicrobiales
Bacteria described in 2003